The Australian states each elected three members of the Australian Senate at the 1903 federal election to serve a six-year term starting on 1 January 1904.

Australia

New South Wales

Each elector voted for up to three candidates. Percentages refer to the number of voters rather than the number of votes.

Queensland

Each elector voted for up to three candidates. Percentages refer to the number of voters rather than the number of votes.

|- class="vcard"
|  |
| class="org" style="width: 170px" | 
| class="fn" | Walter Tunbridge
| style="text-align: right; margin-right: 0.5em" | 47,927
| style="text-align: right; margin-right: 0.5em" | 40.0
| style="text-align: right; margin-right: 0.5em" | 
|- class="vcard"
|  |
| class="org" style="width: 170px" | 
| class="fn" | John Bartholomew
| style="text-align: right; margin-right: 0.5em" | 47,081
| style="text-align: right; margin-right: 0.5em" | 39.2
| style="text-align: right; margin-right: 0.5em" | 
|-
|- class="vcard"
|  |
| class="org" style="width: 170px" | 
| class="fn" | John Murray	
| style="text-align: right; margin-right: 0.5em" | 41,719
| style="text-align: right; margin-right: 0.5em" | 34.8
| style="text-align: right; margin-right: 0.5em" | 
|-

|- class="vcard"
|  |
| class="org" style="width: 170px" | 
| class="fn" | 
| style="text-align: right; margin-right: 0.5em" | 136,664
| style="text-align: right; margin-right: 0.5em" | 38.0
| style="text-align: right; margin-right: 0.5em" | 
|-

South Australia

Each elector voted for up to three candidates. Percentages refer to the number of voters rather than the number of votes.

Tasmania

Each elector voted for up to three candidates. Percentages refer to the number of voters rather than the number of votes.

Victoria

There were four vacancies in Victoria due to the death of Sir Frederick Sargood. Robert Reid (Free Trade) had filled the seat in the interim, with the fourth senator elected serving the balance of Sargood's term ending on 31 December 1906. Each elector voted for up to four candidates. Percentages refer to the number of voters rather than the number of votes.

Western Australia

Each elector voted for up to three candidates. Percentages refer to the number of voters rather than the number of votes.

See also 
 Candidates of the 1903 Australian federal election
 Results of the 1903 Australian federal election (House of Representatives)
 Members of the Australian Senate, 1904–1906

Notes

References

1903 elections in Australia
Senate 1903
Australian Senate elections